The Lithuania national football team represents Lithuania in association football and is controlled by the Lithuanian Football Federation (LFF), the governing body of the sport in the country.

The team's largest victory came between 1922 and 1939 when they defeated Estonia 4–0 on 13 September 1930. Their worst loss between 1922 and 1939 was actually there heaviest defeat on Lithuania. It was a 10–0 defeat from Egypt on 27 May 1924.

Results

1922
No matches played

1923

1924

1925

1926

1927

1928

1929

1930

1931

1932

1933

1934

1935

1936

1937

1938

1939

Record by opponent

References

External links
Lithuania - International Results
Reports for all matches of Lithuania national team
11v11.com Fixtures & Results

Lithuania national football team
1920s in Lithuanian sport
1930s in Lithuanian sport